9th Reconnaissance Squadron may refer to:

 The 9th Tactical Reconnaissance Squadron, part of the lineage of the modern United States Air Force's 9th Combat Operations Squadron
 The 495th Tactical Fighter Squadron, designated 9th Reconnaissance Squadron (Light) from January 1941 to August 1941
 The 488th Fighter Squadron, designated 9th Reconnaissance Squadron (Fighter) from April 1943 to August 1943
 The 9th Combat Operations Squadron, formerly the 9th Space Operations Squadron, previously designated 9th Reconnaissance Squadron, Very Long Range (Photographic) from June 1946 to October 1947
 The 99th Air Refueling Squadron, constituted as the 9th Reconnaissance Squadron (Heavy), but redesignated before activation

See also 
 9th Weather Reconnaissance Squadron (Provisional), a provisional organization providing weather information for Ninth Air Force units from June 1944 to June 1945, flying from bases in France